Jackson Township is a township in Texas County, in the U.S. state of Missouri.

Jackson Township was erected in 1845, taking its name from Jackson D. Trusty, a politically active early citizen.

References

Townships in Missouri
Townships in Texas County, Missouri